Statistics of the USFSA Football Championship in the 1903 season.

Tournament

First round
 Stade Bordelais UC - Olympique de Marseille

Quarterfinals 
 Le Havre AC 3-0 Sport Athlétique Sézannais
 RC France 5-0 Stade Bordelais UC
 Union Athlétique du Lycée Malherbe 4-1 Football Club Rennais
RC Roubaix - Amiens AC (Amiens forfeited)

Semifinals  
 RC France 5-1 Union Athlétique du Lycée Malherbe
RC Roubaix - Le Havre AC (Havre forfeited)

Final  
RC France 2-2 RC Roubaix (match replayed)
RC Roubaix 3-1 RC France

References
RSSF

USFSA Football Championship
1
France